Olivier Sarr (born 20 February 1999) is a French professional basketball player for the Oklahoma City Thunder of the National Basketball Association (NBA), on a two-way contract with the Oklahoma City Blue of the NBA G League. He played college basketball for the Wake Forest Demon Deacons and the Kentucky Wildcats.

Early life and career
Sarr started playing basketball at age three with his father, a former player, and drew inspiration from Hakeem Olajuwon. He played for club teams Bouscat and TOAC before joining INSEP, a sports institute in Paris. He competed for Centre Fédéral in the Nationale Masculine 1 and represented INSEP at the Adidas Next Generation Tournament. Sarr moved to the United States when he was 15 years old. He was considered a four-star recruit by Scout and committed to Wake Forest over offers from California, Vanderbilt and UCF.

College career
Sarr averaged 3.2 points and 3.0 rebounds per game as a freshman at Wake Forest. He gained 20 pounds going into his sophomore season. As a sophomore, Sarr started 16 games and averaged 6.2 points and 5.5 rebounds per game, leading the team with 25 blocks. On 29 February 2020, Sarr scored a career-high 37 points and grabbed 17 rebounds in a 84–73 victory over Notre Dame. As a junior, Sarr averaged 13.7 points and 9.0 rebounds per game and had 11 double-doubles. He was named to the Third Team All-ACC. After coach Danny Manning was fired, Sarr entered the transfer portal. In May 2020, he announced he was transferring to Kentucky after receiving interest from  Duke, Baylor, Florida State and Gonzaga. Sarr applied for a waiver for immediate eligibility at Kentucky. He, along with fellow transfer Jacob Toppin, received immediate eligibility on 21 October 2020. Sarr averaged 10.8 points, 5.2 rebounds and 1.2 blocks per game. He declared for the 2021 NBA draft, forgoing the additional season of eligibility granted by the NCAA due to the COVID-19 pandemic.

Professional career

Oklahoma City Thunder / Blue (2021–present)
After going undrafted in 2021 NBA draft, Sarr played for the Memphis Grizzlies in the NBA Summer League. On 16 October 2021, he was signed and then immediately waived by the Oklahoma City Thunder. He subsequently joined the Oklahoma City Blue of the NBA G League, posting 14 points and 7 rebounds in his debut versus the Salt Lake City Stars. 

On 27 December, Sarr signed a 10-day contract with the Thunder and re-joined the Blue on 6 January 2022. Three days later, he signed a second 10-day contract with the Thunder. He was reacquired and activated by the Oklahoma City Blue on 19 January.

On 21 February 2022, Sarr signed a two-way contract with the Thunder. He was waived by the Thunder on 6 April 2022.

Sarr joined the Phoenix Suns for the 2022 NBA Summer League.

On 7 September 2022, the Portland Trail Blazers announced that they had signed Sarr. On 13 October, the Trail Blazers announced that they had converted their contract with Sarr to a two-way contract. On 18 November, the Trail Blazers announced that they had waived Sarr. He never played a game for the team.

On 11 January 2023, Sarr was re-acquired by the Oklahoma City Blue. On 13 February, he signed a two-way contract with the Oklahoma City Thunder.

National team career
Sarr played for France at the 2016 FIBA Under-17 World Championship in Zaragoza, Spain. He averaged 4.4 points and four rebounds per game and helped his team finish in sixth place. At the 2017 FIBA U18 European Championship in Slovakia, Sarr averaged 7.6 points and 5.4 rebounds per game for the sixth-place team.

Career statistics

NBA

|-
| style="text-align:left;"| 
| style="text-align:left;"| Oklahoma City
| 22 || 2 || 19.1 || .574 || .448 || .828 || 4.2 || .9 || .3 || .7 || 7.0
|- class="sortbottom"
| style="text-align:center;" colspan="2"|Career
| 22 || 2 || 19.1 || .574 || .448 || .828 || 4.2 || .9 || .3 || .7 || 7.0

College

|-
| style="text-align:left;"| 2017–18
| style="text-align:left;"| Wake Forest
| 30 || 0 || 15.1 || .348 || .250 || .600 || 3.0 || .4 || .3 || .7 || 3.2
|-
| style="text-align:left;"| 2018–19
| style="text-align:left;"| Wake Forest
| 25 || 16 || 21.7 || .472 || .250 || .705 || 5.5 || .5 || .4 || 1.0 || 6.2
|-
| style="text-align:left;"| 2019–20
| style="text-align:left;"| Wake Forest
| 30 || 15 || 26.7 || .527 || .143 || .761 || 9.0 || .9 || .4 || 1.2 || 13.7
|-
| style="text-align:left;"| 2020–21
| style="text-align:left;"| Kentucky
| 25 || 25 || 25.1 || .470 || .444 || .791 || 5.2 || 1.3 || .4 || 1.2 || 10.8
|- class="sortbottom"
| style="text-align:center;" colspan="2"| Career
| 110 || 56 || 22.0 || .476 || .311 || .740 || 5.7 || .8 || .4 || 1.0 || 8.5

Personal life
Sarr is the son of Massar and Marie Sarr and has a younger brother, Alexandre. He is of Senegalese descent. Sarr's father played professional basketball in France, and Alexandre plays for Real Madrid at the youth level.

References

External links
Kentucky Wildcats bio
Wake Forest Demon Deacons bio

1999 births
Living people
Centers (basketball)
French expatriate basketball people in the United States
French men's basketball players
French sportspeople of Senegalese descent
Kentucky Wildcats men's basketball players
Oklahoma City Blue players
Oklahoma City Thunder players
People from Niort
Sportspeople from Deux-Sèvres
Undrafted National Basketball Association players
Wake Forest Demon Deacons men's basketball players